Diane Roberts is an American author, columnist, essayist, radio commentator, reviewer and professor. She is the author of three books and a documentary-maker for the BBC.

Career
Roberts has been a commentator for NPR since 1993, a political columnist for the St. Petersburg Times, a journalist for The New York Times, The Guardian, The Washington Post, the Atlanta Journal-Constitution and the Orlando Sentinel.

Roberts is professor of literature and writing at Florida State University and a visiting fellow in creative writing at the University of Northumbria in England, specializing in Southern United States culture.

Background
An eighth-generation Floridian whose family has lived in Florida since 1799, Roberts is related to numerous famous Floridians, including Florida's 19th governor Napoleon Bonaparte Broward, and L. Clayton Roberts who was director of Florida's Division of Elections during the 2000 US presidential election. Roberts attended Brasenose College, Oxford as a Marshall Scholar.

Publications 
Books
 Dream State: Eight Generations of Swamp Lawyers, Conquistadors, Confederate Daughters, Banana Republicans, and other Florida Wildlife Free Press, 2004.
 Faulkner and Southern Womanhood, University of Georgia Press, 1993.
 The Myth of Aunt Jemima, Routledge, 1994.

Sundry
 Numerous articles and essays are found at "Faculty & Staff : Diane Roberts - University of Alabama".
 Broadcast commentaries are found at "Diane Robert's archive at NPR", Retrieved 2011-07-19.
 Columns are found at "The Guardian — Diane Roberts", Retrieved 2011-07-19.

References

External links 
 "Quotes attributed to Diane Roberts"

Florida State University faculty
Living people
American humorists
American columnists
Writers from Tallahassee, Florida
Year of birth missing (living people)
The New York Times writers
The Washington Post journalists
The Guardian journalists
The Atlanta Journal-Constitution people
Orlando Sentinel people
American women columnists
Women humorists
Alumni of Brasenose College, Oxford
American women non-fiction writers
American women academics
21st-century American women